Journal of Physics and Chemistry of Solids is a peer-reviewed scientific journal of condensed matter physics and material science. The journal is edited by M. Azuma, A. Bansil, H.-P. Cheng, and K. Prassides. The journal was established in 1957 by Harvey Brooks, and is published monthly by Elsevier.

In 1963 the Letters section of the journal split to form Solid State Communications.

Abstracting and indexing
The journal is abstracted and indexed in the following databases:
Cambridge Scientific Abstracts
Chemical Abstracts
Current Contents/Engineering, Computing & Technology
Materials Science Citation Index
EIC/Intelligence
Engineering Index
INSPEC
 PASCAL
SSSA/CISA/ECA/ISMEC
Scopus

References

External links

Hybrid open access journals
Physics journals
Chemistry journals
Materials science journals
Publications established in 1957
Elsevier academic journals